Jon Taylor (born 1992) is an English footballer.

Jon Taylor may also refer to:

Jon Taylor (sound mixer), American re-recording mixer
Jon Taylor, musician in Septic Death

See also
John Taylor (disambiguation)
Jonathan Taylor (disambiguation)